Karina Habšudová and Daniela Hantuchová were the defending champions but chose to compete at Zürich during the same week, with different partners.

Dája Bedáňová and Elena Bovina won the title by defeating Nathalie Dechy and Meilen Tu 6–3, 6–4 in the final.

Seeds

Draw

Draw

References

External links
 Official results archive (ITF)
 Official results archive (WTA)

WTA Bratislava
2001 in Slovak women's sport
2001 in Slovak tennis